Johnny Murray (25 February 1898 – 12 November 1954) was an Irish soccer player during the 1920s.

Murray was a skilful winger who played for Ormeau, Blue Crusaders, Bohemians and Drumcondra F.C. 
He joined Bohs in 1921 and stayed at Dalymount Park until 1926 when he joined Drumcondra. He made 63 league appearances and scored 11 goals while with Bohs. Johnny was part of their first ever league winning side alongside the likes of Stephen McCarthy in 1923/24 and played for Ireland in the Paris Olympic Games of 1924.

Honours
League of Ireland: 1
 Bohemians – 1923/24
FAI Cup: 1
 Drumcondra F.C. – 1926/27
Represented Ireland in the 1924 Olympic Games
Won League of Ireland Representative Caps

References

External links

Murray at 1924 Olympic Games

1898 births
1954 deaths
Irish association footballers (before 1923)
Republic of Ireland association footballers
Bohemian F.C. players
League of Ireland players
Irish Free State association footballers
Olympic footballers of Ireland
Footballers at the 1924 Summer Olympics
League of Ireland XI players
Drumcondra F.C. players
Association football forwards